Pitsamai Sornsai (Thai: พิสมัย สอนไสย์) is a Thai footballer who plays as a forward.

International goals

Footballing honours

International
Thailand
 AFC Women's Championship: fifth place: 2014
 AFC Women's U-17 Championship: third place: 2005 
 AFF Women's Championship: 2011
 runner-up: 2007
 third place: 2008, 2012
 Southeast Asian Games Gold Medal: 2007, 2013
 Silver Medal: 2009

Clubs
RBAC
 Thai Women's Premier League: 2009, 2010

Individual
 Thai Women's Premier League Top Scorer: 2009 (21 goals)
 Southeast Asian Games Top Scorer: 2009

External links
Pitsamai Sornsai profile at FIFA.com

1989 births
Living people
Pitsamai Sornsai
Pitsamai Sornsai
Pitsamai Sornsai
Pitsamai Sornsai
Speranza Osaka-Takatsuki players
Expatriate women's footballers in Japan
Pitsamai Sornsai
Women's association football forwards
Footballers at the 2006 Asian Games
Footballers at the 2010 Asian Games
Footballers at the 2014 Asian Games
Pitsamai Sornsai
Pitsamai Sornsai
Southeast Asian Games medalists in football
Footballers at the 2018 Asian Games
Competitors at the 2007 Southeast Asian Games
Competitors at the 2009 Southeast Asian Games
Competitors at the 2013 Southeast Asian Games
Competitors at the 2017 Southeast Asian Games
2019 FIFA Women's World Cup players
FIFA Century Club
Pitsamai Sornsai
Competitors at the 2019 Southeast Asian Games